Sir John Pelham, 3rd Baronet (1623–1703) was an English landowner and Member of Parliament who sat in the Commons between 1645 and 1698.

Personal details

John Pelham was born in 1623, eldest son of Sir Thomas Pelham, 2nd Baronet, and his wife Mary Wilbraham,  daughter of Sir Roger Wilbraham, the Solicitor General for Ireland.

In January 1647, he married Lady Lucy Sydney, daughter of Robert Sydney, 2nd Earl of Leicester and his wife Lady Dorothy Percy.  They had three sons and three daughters:
Dorothy Pelham, died at two days old (15 December 1648 - 17 December 1648)
Elizabeth Pelham, married Edward Montagu
Lucy Pelham, married Gervase Pierrepont, 1st Baron Pierrepont
Thomas Pelham, 1st Baron Pelham (1653–1712)
John Pelham, died unmarried
Henry Pelham (c.1661–1721)

He was succeeded by his son Thomas who was created Baron Pelham in 1706.

Career

In 1645, Pelham was elected Member of Parliament for Hastings to replace disabled Royalists in the Long Parliament. He was secluded in Pride's Purge in 1648. He inherited the baronetcy on the death of his father in 1654.  In 1654 he was elected MP for Sussex in the First Protectorate Parliament and continued sitting in the Second Protectorate Parliament until 1658. After the Stuart Restoration, he sat as MP for Sussex from 1660 to 1681, and after the November 1688 Glorious Revolution, was re-elected in 1689 before retiring in 1698.

In 1694, Pelham attended a cricket match at Lewes and his personal accounts refer to him paying for a wager at the time. This is one of the earliest references in cricket history in which a named individual is involved.

References

Sources
 
 

 
 

1623 births
1703 deaths
Baronets in the Baronetage of England
John
English cricket in the 14th to 17th centuries
English MPs 1640–1648
English MPs 1654–1655
English MPs 1656–1658
English MPs 1660
English MPs 1661–1679
English MPs 1679
English MPs 1680–1681
English MPs 1689–1690
English MPs 1690–1695
English MPs 1695–1698
Alumni of Emmanuel College, Cambridge
English politicians